Oliver Lyttelton, 1st Viscount Chandos,   (15 March 1893 – 21 January 1972) was a British businessman from the Lyttelton family who was brought into government during the Second World War, holding a number of ministerial posts.

Background, education and military career
Born in Mayfair, London, Lord Chandos was the son of the Rt. Hon. Alfred Lyttelton, younger son of George Lyttelton, 4th Baron Lyttelton. His mother was his father's second wife Edith, daughter of Archibald Balfour. He was educated at Eton and Trinity College, Cambridge. He served in the Grenadier Guards in the First World War, where he met Winston Churchill, and was awarded the Distinguished Service Order and Military Cross.

From 1947 to 1955 he served as the first President of Farnborough Bowling Club, Hampshire, in his Aldershot parliamentary constituency.

Business career
According to the Dictionary of National Biography:
In August 1920 Lyttelton was invited to join the British Metal Corporation, a firm established at the instigation of the British government with the long-term strategic objective of undermining Germany's domination of the metal trade and making the British Empire self-supporting in non-ferrous metals. After a brief apprenticeship Lyttelton served as general manager of the corporation and subsequently as managing director. He also became chairman of the London Tin Corporation and joined the boards of a number of foreign companies, including that of the German firm Metallgesellschaft. He became one of a small group of individuals who through their multiple, interlocking directorships, effectively controlled the global metal trade. . . .  On the outbreak of war in September 1939 he was appointed controller of non-ferrous metals. He set about exploiting his extensive network of personal contacts and his intimate knowledge of the mining industry in order to secure for Britain vital supplies of metals at highly advantageous rates. His unconventional methods caused some anxiety at the Treasury, but over the course of the war they saved Britain a substantial amount of money.
After the Conservative Party left office in 1945, Lyttelton became the chairman of Associated Electrical Industries.

Political career

Chandos entered Parliament as Conservative Member of Parliament (MP) for Aldershot in a wartime by-election in 1940 and was sworn of the Privy Council the same year. He entered Winston Churchill's war coalition as President of the Board of Trade in 1940, a post he held until 1941, and then served as Minister-Resident for the Middle East from 1941 to 1942, and as Minister of Production from 1942 to 1945. He was again President of the Board of Trade in Churchill's brief 1945 caretaker government. After the Conservatives' 1951 election victory, he was considered for the job of Chancellor of the Exchequer, but was seen as too linked to business and the City of London, so the job was given to Rab Butler. Instead he became Secretary of State for the Colonies, a position which he held until 1954. The latter year he was elevated to the peerage as Viscount Chandos, of Aldershot in the County of Southampton.

Family home
In 1948, the 5th Earl Nelson sold Trafalgar Park, Wiltshire, to John Osborne, 11th Duke of Leeds, whose brother-in-law Oliver Lyttelton, 1st Viscount Chandos, lived there while he was an MP. Eventually Lyttleton bought the estate and lived there until 1971, when Jeremy Pinckney bought the house.

Later career
After ending his career as an MP, Chandos returned to Associated Electrical Industries, and steered it to become a major British company. In 1961 he was invited to deliver the MacMillan Memorial Lecture to the Institution of Engineers and Shipbuilders in Scotland. He chose the subject "Jungle – or Cloister? – Some Thoughts on the Present Industrial Scene".

National Theatre
In 1962, Chandos became the first chairman of the National Theatre, serving until 1971. He then served as president until his death. His parents had been active campaigners for its development, and the Lyttelton Theatre, part of the National's South Bank complex, was named after him.

During Laurence Olivier's tenure as director of the National, Chandos was a central figure in the controversy over a proposed production of Rolf Hochhuth's Soldiers. The production had been championed by Olivier's dramaturg, Kenneth Tynan. Though Olivier, a great admirer of Winston Churchill (who essentially is accused of assassinating Polish Prime Minister General Władysław Sikorski by Hochhuth) did not particularly like the play or its depiction of Churchill (whom Tynan wanted him to play), he backed his dramaturg. There was a potential problem with the Lord Chamberlain, who might not have licensed the play due to its controversial stand on Churchill. The National's board vetoed the production and Lord Chandos damned the play as a "grotesque and grievous libel".

Order of the Garter

In 1970 he was made a Knight of the Garter. His Garter banner, which hung in St. George's Chapel in Windsor during his lifetime, is now on display in the church of St John the Baptist, Hagley.

Marriage & children
Lord Chandos married Lady Moira Godolphin Osborne, a daughter of George Osborne, 10th Duke of Leeds on 30 January 1920. They had three sons and one daughter:

 Antony Alfred Lyttelton, 2nd Viscount Chandos (born 23 October 1920, died 28 November 1980)
 Hon Rosemary Lyttelton (born 30 May 1922, died 21 October 2003), married Anthony Chaplin, 3rd Viscount Chaplin in 1951.
 Lieutenant Julian Lyttelton (born 30 August 1923, killed in action in Italy on 11 October 1944 during World War II
 Hon Nicholas Adrian Oliver Lyttelton (born 26 March 1937)

Lord Chandos died in Marylebone, London, in January 1972, aged 78, and was succeeded by his eldest son, Antony. Lady Chandos died in May 1976, aged 84.

References

Further reading 
 Ball, Simon. The Guardsmen: Harold Macmillan, Three Friends and the World They Made. Harper Perennial, 2005, .
 Viscount Chandos, Oliver Lyttelton. The Memoirs of Lord Chandos. The Bodley Head, 1962.
 Howard, Anthony. RAB: The Life of R. A. Butler. Jonathan Cape, 1987 .

External links 

 
 
The Papers of Alfred Lyttleton, Edith Lyttleton and Oliver Lyttleton held at Churchill Archives Centre, Cambridge

1893 births
1972 deaths
Alumni of Trinity College, Cambridge
British Army personnel of World War I
British people of World War II
Companions of the Distinguished Service Order
Lyttelton, Oliver
English Anglicans
Grenadier Guards officers
Knights of the Garter
Oliver
Members of the Privy Council of the United Kingdom
Ministers in the Churchill caretaker government, 1945
Ministers in the Churchill wartime government, 1940–1945
Ministers in the third Churchill government, 1951–1955
People educated at Eton College
Presidents of the Board of Trade
Recipients of the Military Cross
Secretaries of State for the Colonies
Lyttelton, Oliver
Lyttelton, Oliver
Lyttelton, Oliver
Lyttelton, Oliver
UK MPs who were granted peerages
Viscounts created by Elizabeth II
20th-century English businesspeople